Chankotadze is a Georgian surname. Notable people with the surname include:

Devi Chankotadze (born 1961), Georgian military person
Giorgi Chankotadze (born 1977), Georgian footballer

Georgian-language surnames